Joanne Whittaker is a marine geophysicist, from the Institute for Marine and Antarctic Studies at the University of Tasmania, who was awarded the Dorothy Hill award in 2017, and a L'Oreal Women in Science Fellowship in 2013. Her research contributes to understanding the structure and evolution of the Earth.

Career 
Whittaker obtained a Bachelor of Science (hons)/ Bachelor of Commerce from the University of Sydney in 2003, followed by a Masters of Geophysics in 2005, from the University of Wellington. Her thesis was titled "Late Tertiary vertical movements and sedimentation". She obtained a PhD from the University of Sydney, in 2008.

Whittaker has conducted research in geophysics, including understanding the structure and evolution of the Earth. This involves examining deep and surface processes and the relationships between them. Whittaker's work has provided an understanding around the geological history of the planet, including investigating the breakup of supercontinent, known as Pangaea. She has also investigated and published research around the evolution of ocean basins in the regions surrounding Australia. Whittaker has also been an Honorary Research Fellow, from 2008–present at the University of Leeds, UK.

Publications

Awards 
 2017: Dorothy Hill Award from the Australian Academy of Science
 2013: L'Oreal Women in Science Fellowship
 2010: NSW Tall Poppy Award
 2007: Post-graduate award from University of Sydney

References

External links 

 Tectonic consequences of mid-ocean ridge evolution and subduction, PhD thesis
 https://pub.orcid.org/v3.0_rc1/0000-0002-3170-3935/external-identifiers/1619769
 https://pub.orcid.org/v3.0_rc1/0000-0002-3170-3935/external-identifiers/42530
 https://pub.orcid.org/v3.0_rc1/0000-0002-3170-3935/researcher-urls/625646
 https://pub.orcid.org/v3.0_rc1/0000-0002-3170-3935/researcher-urls/625645

Living people
Australian women academics
Australian women scientists
Marine geophysicists
University of Sydney alumni
Academic staff of the University of Tasmania
Year of birth missing (living people)